Lac-Douaire is an unorganized territory of Quebec, Canada. It is the largest geo-political division in the Laurentides region, and one of eleven unorganized areas in the Antoine-Labelle Regional County Municipality.

Demographics
Population trend:
 Population in 2011: 5
 Population in 2006: 0
 Population in 2001: 0
 Population in 1996: 2
 Population in 1991: 0

See also
List of unorganized territories in Quebec

References

Unorganized territories in Laurentides